Le Broc is a commune in the Alpes-Maritimes department in southeastern France.

Shops and Restaurants:
L'estragon, Chez l'italien, Au Bon Coin, L'Epi Du Broc, Salle De Spectacle Les Arts, Sodial, Bulle d'Haire and Megane Borg Secretariat.

Population

Fishing
Le Broc consists of the river Var and the lake of Broc (Lac du Broc). Fishing is a popular activity in this man made lake however a license is required. A fishing license can be obtained in most tourist offices and local fishing clubs or shops. The main species of fish in the lake consist of: bleak, roach, perch, and mirror carp.

See also
Communes of the Alpes-Maritimes department

References

Communes of Alpes-Maritimes
Alpes-Maritimes communes articles needing translation from French Wikipedia